Pavel Mahrer (or Paul Mahrer, 23 May 1900 – 18 December 1985) was a Czech football midfielder of German-Jewish ethnicity who played at the 1924 Summer Olympics. Bank clerk and merchant by occupation, Mahrer played professionally in Czechoslovakia and the United States.

Club career
Mahrer began his career with Teplitzer FK. In 1923, he joined DFC Prag before moving to the United States in 1926 to sign with the Brooklyn Wanderers of the American Soccer League. He returned to Czechoslovakia after the season, but was back in the United States in December 1928. At that time, he joined the Hakoah All Stars in the Eastern Professional Soccer League. In 1929, Hakoah moved to the American Soccer League, where Mahrer played until the fall of 1931. In 1932, he returned to Czechoslovakia to sign with Teplitzer FK. In 1933, he moved to DFC Prag, where he finished his career in 1936. After the German occupation of the Sudetenland, he was imprisoned at the Theresienstadt concentration camp on account of his Jewish ethnicity. He survived World War II and died in 1985 in the United States.

International
Mahrer earned six caps with the Czechoslovakia national football team between 1923 and 1926. In 1924, he played two games for the Czechoslovak Olympic football team at the 1924 Summer Olympics.

References

External links
 
 
 

1900 births
1985 deaths
American Soccer League (1921–1933) players
Brooklyn Wanderers players
Czechoslovak footballers
Czechoslovak expatriate footballers
Czechoslovakia international footballers
Hakoah All-Stars players
Olympic footballers of Czechoslovakia
Footballers at the 1924 Summer Olympics
People from Teplice
People from the Kingdom of Bohemia
Czech Jews
Expatriate soccer players in the United States
Czechoslovak expatriate sportspeople in the United States
Theresienstadt Ghetto survivors
Association football midfielders
German Bohemian people
DFC Prag players